Vetri may refer to:

Films
Vetri (film), Indian film
Vetri Vizha, Indian film
Vetri Kodi Kattu, Indian film
Vetri Selvan, Indian film

People
Victoria Vetri (born 1944), American model and actress
Vetri (cinematographer), Indian cinematographer
Vetri (actor), Indian actor